The Deputy Minister of Education (Malay: Timbalan Menteri Pendidikan; ; Tamil: கல்வி பிரதி அமைச்சர் ) is a Malaysian cabinet position serving as deputy head of the Ministry of Education.

List of Deputy Ministers of Education
The following individuals have been appointed as Deputy Minister of Education, or any of its precedent titles:

See also 
 Minister of Education (Malaysia)

References 

Ministry of Education (Malaysia)